The 2003 Big Sky Conference men's basketball tournament was held March 8–12 at the Dee Events Center at Weber State University in Ogden, Utah.

Top-seeded Weber State defeated  in the championship game, 60–57, to win their seventh Big Sky men's basketball tournament title. It was EWU's third consecutive Big Sky championship game loss.

The Wildcats, in turn, received an automatic bid to the 2003 NCAA tournament. No other Big Sky members were invited this year.

Format
No new teams were added to the Big Sky prior to the 2002–03 season, leaving total membership at eight. Despite joining the conference in 1996, this was Sacramento State's first appearance in a Big Sky tournament.

No changes were made to the existing tournament format. Only the top six teams from the regular season conference standings were invited to the tournament. The two top teams were given byes into the semifinals while the third- through sixth-seeded teams were placed and paired into the preliminary quarterfinal round. Following the quarterfinals, the two victorious teams were re-seeded in the semifinal round, with the lowest-seeded remaining team paired with the tournament's highest seed and vis-versa for the other.

Bracket

See also
Big Sky Conference women's basketball tournament

References

Big Sky Conference men's basketball tournament
Tournament
Big Sky Conference men's basketball tournament
Big Sky Conference men's basketball tournament
Basketball competitions in Ogden, Utah
College sports tournaments in Utah